This is a complete list of Philippine presidents by college education that consists of the 17 heads of state in the history of the Philippines. 

Almost all presidents (except Emilio Aguinaldo, Joseph Estrada, and Bongbong Marcos) completed a college degree program. College and postgraduate education have prepared presidents in their future roles as heads of state, architects of foreign policy, commanders-in-chief of the Armed Forces of the Philippines, and managers of the entire government bureaucracy. 

By law, under the Constitution of the Philippines, any Filipino citizen aged forty and above who can read and write and can meet residency requirements is eligible to run as President. However, in practice, popularity, political machinery, and financial resources are the key elements leading to a successful presidential candidate.

List by degree 
This section lists presidents according to schools from which they earned degrees. Schools that presidents attended but did not earn degrees from are not included.

Did not graduate from college 
 Emilio Aguinaldo (A cholera epidemic forced the Colegio de San Juan de Letran where Aguinaldo attended the equivalent of high school to close in 1880. Aguinaldo never returned to any form of schooling following this closure.)
 Joseph Estrada (Estrada attended Mapúa Institute of Technology before transferring to Polytechnic Colleges of the Philippines, where he later dropped out.)
 Bongbong Marcos (Marcos attended the Center for Research and Communication, where he took a special diploma course in economics, but did not finish. He also attended St Edmund Hall at the University of Oxford, studying philosophy, politics and economics (PPE). However, despite his claims that he graduated with a bachelor of arts in PPE, he did not obtain such a degree. Marcos had passed philosophy, but failed economics, and failed politics twice, thus making him ineligible for a degree. Instead, he received a special diploma in social studies, which was awarded mainly to non-graduates and is currently no longer offered by the university.)

LL.B. 
The J.D. was first conferred in the Philippines in lieu of the LL.B. by the Ateneo Law School in 1990, with the model program later adopted by most schools now offering the J.D. However, no president as of yet has graduated with the J.D., as all have earned the LL.B. prior to 1990.

Master's

Ph.D.

Undergraduate 
Some presidents attended more than one institution, though only those from which they earned undergraduate degrees are included here.  Two presidents never earned undergraduate degrees: Emilio Aguinaldo never attended college, while Joseph Estrada dropped out from both colleges that he attended. One, Bongbong Marcos, did not finish his special diploma course at the Center for Research and Communication and received only a special diploma in social studies from the University of Oxford as he failed two components of his program of study, making him ineligible to receive an undergraduate degree. Marcos still falsely claims that he obtained a degree from Oxford despite Oxford confirming in 2015 and 2021 that Marcos did not finish his degree.

Three presidents attended foreign colleges at the undergraduate level: Corazon Aquino, Fidel Ramos, and Bongbong Marcos. One president attended a United States service academy: Fidel Ramos graduated from the United States Military Academy as part of his professional education as a career soldier.

List by specialization

Business school

Law school

List by presidents

Other academic associations

Faculty member

School rector or president

School trustee or governor

Notes

See also
Education in the Philippines
 List of prime ministers of Australia by education
 List of prime ministers of Canada by academic degrees
 List of prime ministers of the United Kingdom by education
 List of presidents of the United States by education

References

Philippines 
College Education, List of Philippine Presidents by